P. Kalaimani was an Indian writer, producer and director who worked in the Tamil cinema. He has written story, screenplay and dialogues for more than 100 films.

Film career
He was a writer who has been in the industry for three decades and seen success through his work, some of his greatest work are Bharathiraaja's 16 Vayathinile, Mann Vasanai, Gopurangal Saivathillai, Muthal Vasantham, Ingeyum Oru Gangai and many more. He was awarded Kalaimamani by the state government and he has also produced and directed few movies. He worked with the likes of Sathyaraj and Vijayakanth in his career spanning over three decades. His last film as dialogue writer was Kuruvi.  He has also written and directed films like Therkathi Kallan and Manitha Jaathi.

He produced lot of films under the banner of Everest Films.

Partial filmography

Death
He died at midnight on 3 April 2012 due to prolonged illness. He was survived by wife Saraswathi.

References

External links 
 

Tamil film producers
2012 deaths
Tamil screenwriters
Place of birth missing
1950 births
Kannada screenwriters
Tamil film directors
Film producers from Chennai
Film directors from Chennai
20th-century Indian dramatists and playwrights
21st-century Indian dramatists and playwrights
Telugu screenwriters
Screenwriters from Chennai